Chrysorthenches porphyritis is a species of moth of the family Plutellidae. It was first described by Edward Meyrick in 1885 and is endemic to New Zealand. This species can be found on both the North and South Islands in open native forest and scrub at altitudes from sea level up to 1370 m. The larvae feed on Podocarpus laetus, P. totara, P. nivalis, and Phyllocladus alpinus. The larvae create a shelter by loosely spinning together the leaves of its host plant and can be found feeding in groups. The pupa is formed inside a thin cocoon. Hudson was of the opinion that this species had two broods a year. Adult moths are on the wing all year round. The adults of this species, particularly the female, are variable in colouration and in forewing pattern.

Taxonomy 
This species was first described by Edward Meyrick in 1885 and named Orthenches porphyritis. Meyrick went on to give a more detailed description of the species in 1886. In 1901, thinking he was describing a new species, Meyrick again named this moth Ypononmeuta cuprea. Meyrick synonymised this name in 1923. In 1927 Alfred Philpott studied the male genitalia of this species. George Hudson discussed and illustrated this species in his 1928 book The butterflies and moths of New Zealand and again discussed the species in his 1939 book A Supplement to the butterflies and moths of New Zealand. In 1996 John S. Dugdale placed this species in the genus Chrysorthenches. The female lectotype, collected in Dunedin in August, is held at the Natural History Museum, London.

Description

Meyrick described the larvae of the species as follows:

Meyrick described the adults of the species as follows:
This species, particularly the female of this species, is extremely variable in both colouration and in the markings on its forewings.

Distribution 
This species is endemic to New Zealand and have been collected throughout the North and South Islands. The adult moths have been collected at altitudes from sea level up to 1370 m.

Behaviour
The larvae feed from a structure they create by loosely spinning together the leaves of its host plant. They can be found feeding in groups. When pupating the insect forms a pupa inside a thin cocoon. Hudson was of the opinion that this species had two broods during each year with adults being on the wing more commonly in September and again in March. However this moth has been collected all year round.

Habitat and host species

The species prefers to inhabit open native forest and scrub. The larval hosts of C. porphyritis are Podocarpus laetus, P. totara, P. nivalis, and Phyllocladus alpinus. The larvae are normally found feeding on P. alpinus where there are nearby Podocarpus species.

DNA analysis 
In 2020 this species along with the other species in the genus Chrysorthenches had their morphological characters studied.

Gallery

References

Moths described in 1885
Plutellidae
Moths of New Zealand
Endemic fauna of New Zealand
Taxa named by Edward Meyrick
Endemic moths of New Zealand